Menadiol is an organic compound with the formula C6H4(COH)2(CH)(CH3).  It is formally a derivative of p-hydroquinone. It is an intermediate in the synthesis of vitamin K4.  It is oxidized to menadione.

References

Naphthols
Vitamin K